This is a list of  Spanish words of Celtic origin.  It is further divided into words that are known (or thought) to have come from Gaulish and those that have come from an undetermined Celtic source.  Some of these words existed in Latin as loanwords from a Celtic source.  Some of these words have alternate etymologies and may also appear on a list of Spanish words from a different language.  Any form with an asterisk (*) is unattested and therefore hypothetical.

List
From English:
 "tunnel"

From French:
 "graduate", from French  and this from late Latin  "bachelor".
 "battle".
 "billiard".
 "brigade"
 "brooch, clasp, clip". From Old French  "a spit," from Vulgar Latin (*) "a nail, spike," from Latin  "a nail, projecting (adj.), buck-toothed (adj.)" from Celtic (*) "a pin, badger."
 "brandy"
 "cream" from French 
 from French 
 "ambassador" and this from gaulish  "who serves around".
 "tannery", from French , from  "tanbark"; akin to Breton  "red oak", Old Cornish , Old and Modern Irish  "mass of metal from furnace; metal bar, ingot"; (ogham letter) "holly, elder".
 "penguin" from fr. .
 "barrel" from French  and this from Celtic * "skin"
 "ton" see *
 "buffoon, jester" from French 

From Italian:

 "brocade".
 "broccoli".

From Late or Vulgar Latin:

 "birch tree" from late Latin  "birch", diminutive of Gaulish  "birch"; akin to Old Irish , Irish/Scottish , Manx , Welsh , Breton .
 "white poplar"
 "lark" (OSp ) from gaulish 
 "shad"

 "plot of land marked for planting"
 "shards, smithereens"
 "arpent" (OSp ) from Latin  "old measure"
 "cross-bar" from common Celtic }
 "railing, balustrade"
 "spleen" from Latin  "red"
 "henbane" from gaulish  "henbane"
 "leadwort"
 "bicolor(ed) (animal); pronghorn bull"
 "watercress" from common Celtic  "watercress"
,  "granitic crag, irregular pearl, round nodule"
 "tar" from Latin *
 "big lip"
 "pruning hook"
/* "billy-goat, buck"
 "dung" from * (PIE * "excrement") Proto-Celtic:  "dirty"
 "common pandora" from Celtic * "spotted, speckled"
OSp  "bran; filth"
 "scrubland"
 "heather"
 "British"
 "cradle, lap"
 "witch"
 "billy goat" from a Celtic *
 "cow pasture"
 "standard, sheth (of plow)",  "water tower"
 "Cambrian"
 "way" from Celtic * through lat. 
 "song"
 "cart"

 "spider crab"

 "beehive"
 "mistress, home-wrecker"
 "belt"
 "circle"
 "maggot"
 "hillock"
 "trough"
 "to addle"

 "large stone"
 "gaillard" from French 
 "hook"
 "claw, talon"
 "heron"
 "handful, fagot"
 "Germanic"
/
 "stubborn or tangled hair"
 through the Latin  from Celtic *
 ~  "vain, vacuous, without substance"
 "open field"
 "lance"
 "to launch"
 "tin, tin can"
 "slime, mud"
 "league (unit)"
 "dregs, lees"

, 
 "flagstone" from hisp-Celtic * "flagstone"
 "mine" through the Latin . However asturian  'vein' directly from Celtic *.
 "moorland"
 "piece" from Celtic * through the Latin .
 "penguin"
 "finch"
 "pot"
 "Portuguese oak"
 "line"
 "brill, seabass"
 "shad"
 "hound"
 "tunic", * "cloak" through the Latin  from Celtic *
 "mountain pasture, commons"
 "ploughed or sown field"
 "rope"
 "auger, drill"
 "tanine"
 "wooden peg"
 "badger"

 "stubborn"
 "mire, muddy place"

 "cudgel, club"
 "rag"
 "straw- or thatch-roofed hut"
 "man"
 "vassal" from Celtic * "servant" through the Latin 
 "path" from Celtic * through the Latin  "way"
,  "dwarf elder"

Inherited Hispano-Celtic
 "white poplar" (also Asturian ); akin to Irish  "elm", Welsh , Cornish , Breton  "elm"
 "lark" (OSp ), from Gaulish  "crest lark", derivative of * "swan", akin to Irish  and Welsh 
, (also Catalan), from Gaulish  "hands together"; akin to Old Irish 
, (also Galician ) from *, from  "around" +  "to go" + -; akin to Old Irish  "to visit, go to", Welsh  "I went", Cornish  "he was going"
 "smithereens" (also Galician , Old Catalan ), from * + -
Old Spanish  "arpent"; akin to Old Irish  "end, extremity", Welsh  "chief" and  "against", Cornish  "id."
 "cross-bar", (also Galician ) from * "bar, beam"; akin to Irish e "ridgepole"
 "railing, balustrade", (also Portuguese , Catalan ) from *, from * "part, portion"; Welsh , Cornish/Breton , Irish 
 "of Belgium, a Belgian": from Latin , singular of Belgae, from Gaulish , possibly meaning "the threatening (ones), the swollen (ones)," the IE root * (cf. Dutch  'to worsen', originally 'to swell'), enlargement of * "to swell"; akin to Old Irish  '(s)he swells'.
 "bicolor; pronghorn", originally just "pronghorn", from * "white-tipped", from * "tip, peak" +  "white"; akin to Irish/Breton  "peak", Cornish/Welsh  "id."; also Old Irish , Ir/Sc , Welsh , Breton 
 "watercress", (also Galician ) from *; akin to Welsh , Breton/Cornish , Old Irish , Irish , Scottish Gaelic 
 "granite crag, cliff", from  "over" and  "rock"
 (dial.) (also Old Spanish , Galician ), from * "load"; akin to Irish/Scottish  "load",  "to rock"
 "big lip, lip blubber" (also Galician  "lip"), from OSp  "snout", from * "animal's mouth", from * "to yell"; akin to Old Irish , Irish  ‘yell, roar’, Scottish , Welsh  ‘to low, sob’, Cornish  ‘to bray’, Breton  ‘to bleat’
 (Huesca) "pruning hook", from * (also French , Occitan ); akin to Welsh  "billhook", Cornish  "id.", Irish  "sickle", Breton  "boar-spear"
 "scrubland; rocky terrain", from *, from  "fortress"; akin to Middle Irish , genitive  "mountain", Scottish  "fortified hill", Welsh  "hill",  "id", Cornish ,  "hill", Breton  "hill",  "brooch, prickles"
Similarly, Catalan , Occitan , Milanese  < *.
 "witch" (also Portuguese , Aragonese , Catalan ), from *, from * "magic"; akin to Middle Welsh  "magic wand", Breton  "witch, magic",  "spells, charms", Old Irish  "charms",  "to light up, illuminate",  "shining one".
 is from Italian  "sharp, tart, rough" and has two possible etymologies:
either it is akin to Welsh  "nimble, lively", Irish/Scottish  "to be surprised, to jump for joy"
or it is from Medieval Latin  "butcher's broom plant", a blend of Latin  "butcher's broom" and Late Latin  "heather"
 "cow pasture" (OSp  "meadow, cowfield", Portuguese , Old Galician  "dairy farm; herd"), from Celtiberian  "byre, cowshed" (Old Irish  "wealth in cattle") and  "field" (cf. Irish , Welsh , Cornish/Breton )
 "standard, sheth (of a plow)", cambija "water tower" (also Galician and Portuguese  "yoke", Galician  "wheel rim"), from * "crooked, bent", feminine of *; akin to Old Irish  'crooked', Irish/Scottish , Welsh , Cornish/Breton  "curved, bent"; Welsh  "tire rim", Breton , both from *.
= cart, cartload, car, streetcar, coach: from Latin  from Gaulish , from the IE root (*) "to run".
 "spider crab", (also Galician , Portuguese ) from Celtic  "first" +  "large, big", referring to the fact it is larger than more common species of crabs; akin to Breton  "before", Cornish ,  "before, early", Welsh  "id.", Irish  "first"; and Middle Irish  "big, large", Welsh/Cornish  "all, entire"
 "beehive" (also Portuguese , Galician ), from * "made from straw", from * "straw" (cf. Leonese  "straw"); akin to Breton  "stalk" (MBr )
 "bent", from *; akin to
= belt, from Gallo-Latin  "strap" (compare also Galician  "twisted twig using as a bond"); akin to Old Irish  "fetter", Scottish  "bond, chain", Welsh  "saddle", Middle Welsh  "leashes", Cornish  "fastening, link", Breton  "link, bond"
 "circle"; akin to Middle Irish  "circle",  "sickle", Welsh  "circle", Cornish  "hedge, boundary; turn, shift"
 "maggot" (also Galician ), older  "maggot", from * "decay"; akin to Old Irish  "to fall", Irish , Scottish 
 "trough" (also Galician ), from * "hand"; akin to Irish , Welsh , Breton 
 "to addle", in OSp "to brood" (also Galician  "to brood, sit on eggs"); akin to Old Irish  'to warm', Welsh/Cornish  'to brood, sit (on eggs)', Breton 
 "large stone", from *, from *; akin to Old Irish  'stone pillar',  'standing stone'
 "hook" (also French  "fallow field"), from * "small curved branch"; akin to Old Irish  "branch"
 "claw, talon"; akin to Welsh  "leg", Corn/Bret  "leg, stalk, stem", Old Irish  "calves of the leg", Irish 
 "heron" (also Portuguese ), from *; akin to Welsh , Cornish , Breton 
 (OSp  "hair, beard"), from *; akin to Old Irish  "beard", Irish , Welsh  "eyelid", Breton 
 "gouge" (also Portuguese , French ), from *; akin to Old Irish  "sting", Scottish  "chisel", Old Welsh  "piercer", Welsh  "beak", Old Breton  "beak", Breton  "tailless"
 "league", from Late Latin ; akin to Old Irish  (gen. ) "stone", Irish 
 "dregs, lees",  "slime, mud" ( ~  ~  "birdlime", Basque ), from *; Old Breton  'silt, deposit', Breton  'dregs', Welsh  'silt, deposit'
Old Spanish  'sterile, infertile', from *, derivative of Latin  'dwarf horse' (cf. Portuguese  'sterile'), from Gaulish * (cf. Basque  'mule')
 "mine", from * (also Asturian  "vein"), from * "ore"; akin to Welsh  "ore", Cornish , Irish 
 "finch" (var. pinchón; also Catalan , Occitan , Tuscan ) from Gaulish ; akin to Welsh , Breton 
 "Portuguese oak", from earlier , from Asturian  (also Aragonese  "oak", Galician  "Portuguese oak"), from * (cf. Gascon , French ) + ; akin to Middle Irish  "curly, gnarled",  "to bend", Irish  "to twist, turn, spin", Old Welsh , Welsh  "twist"
 "brill, seabass", from * "round-limbed", from  "wheel, circle" +  "limb"; akin to Old Irish , Welsh , Cornish , Breton  and Irish  "limb", Welsh  ‘sack, purse’, Cornish  ‘bow-net’
 "shad" (also Portuguese , Catalan , Galician ), from *; akin to Old Irish  "summer", Welsh , Breton , Cornish , with typical Celtic m > b lenition
; akin to Middle Irish  "snare",  "rivet", Welsh  "snare",  "rivet"
, from * "seat"; akin to Old Welsh 
 "tilled or sown field" (also Old Galician , Galician , Portuguese ), from *, from * "separate, apart" + * "field"; akin to Old Irish  "alone", Welsh  "other", Cornish  "self, one's own", and Irish , Welsh , Cornish/Breton .
 (also Portuguese/Italian , Old French ), from Gaulish *; akin to Welsh/Cornish  "chain", Breton  "harness trace", Irish  "rope", Scottish  "straw rope"
, (also Galician ) from *; akin to Welsh  "drill", Irish , Cornish , Breton 
, from *; akin to Scottish ,  "nail, stud"
 "stubborn" (also Catalan  'stiff, rigid', Béarnais  'cruel, treacherous', Italian ,  'miserly, crude'), from *; akin to Middle Irish , Welsh  'miserly, scarce'
 "mire, muddy place" (also Catalan  "pool in a river", Galician  "dam"), from *; akin to Irish/Cornish  "hole", Welsh , Breton 
, from Galician  "skin, bark", from Gaulish *, "skin, hide, rind"; akin to Old Irish  "skin, surface", Irish  "hide, skin", Welsh  "skin", Cornish  "surface", Breton  "rind, surface". From the same source came Late Latin  'wine-cask', whence French  'tun' (wine-cask)',  'barrel'.
 "club, cudgel" (also Portuguese/Galician  "door bolt"), from *; akin to Old Irish  "iron nail, tine", Irish  "metal nail", Scottish  "nail"
 "jester, baffoon" (also Portuguese , Galician  "sadness, pity", French  "vagrant, beggar"); akin to Old Irish  "miserable", Irish , Scottish , Welsh  "wretched", Breton  "beggar", Cornish  "miser; wretched"
 (also Portuguese/Catalan  "wattle hut", dial.

Loanwords
 abomasum: from Modern Latin  (first used in English in 1706) from Latin  +  "intestine of an ox," possibly from Gaulish.
 a muddy place, bog: from  "to dirty to soil," from  +  "mire, muddy place" (possibly from a Celtic word represented in Old Irish  "hole, pit, grave") + the verbal infinitive suffix .
 a bachelor: from Old French  "bachelor, young man, young gentleman" (Modern French ), from Medieval Latin "an advanced student, farmer," probably from Celtic, possibly related to Irish  "rural dweller, farmer."
 to hit, strike: from Latin , "to beat, strike," probably of Celtic origin.
The etymology of Boii is disputed, either "cattle-owners" or "warriors, strikers".
 broccoli
 from Vulgar Latin (*) "a nail
 brooch, clasp, clip, fastener: from Old French  "a spit," from Vulgar Latin (*) "a nail, spike," from Latin  "a nail, projecting (adj.), buck-toothed (adj.)" from Celtic (*) "a pin, badger."
 rabbit: Iberian or Celtiberian; cf Irish , Cornish , Manx , Gaelic , Welsh .
 "tannery", from French , from  "tanbark"; akin to Breton  "red oak", Old Cornish , Old and Modern Irish  "mass of metal from furnace; metal bar, ingot; (ogham letter) "holly, alder".

See also
Linguistic history of Spanish
List of Galician words of Celtic origin
List of Spanish words of Basque/Iberian origin
List of English words of Spanish origin
Lists of English words of Celtic origin
List of French words of Gaulish origin

Notes

Bibliography 
 Cornelius Joseph Crowly, "New Linguistic Date for Hispano-Celtic: An Evaluation", Bono Homini Donum: Essays in Historical Linguistics in Memory of J. Alexander Kerns, vol. 1, ed., Yoël L. Arbeitman & Allan R. Bomhard (Amsterdam: John Benjamins, 1981), pp. 73–85.
 Guido Gómez de Silva, Breve diccionario etimológico de la lengua española
 The American Heritage Dictionary of the English Language, 4th edn. (2000).

Celtic
Spanish